Nowdeh (also Romanized as Nowdeh, Nudeh, and Nūdeh; also known as Nowdeh Bālā va Pā’īn and Nude) is a village in Aliabad-e Ziba Kenar Rural District, Lasht-e Nesha District, Rasht County, Gilan Province, Iran. At the 2006 census, its population was 918, in 296 families.

References 

Populated places in Rasht County